The 2012 Big Ten Conference baseball tournament was held at Huntington Park in Columbus, Ohio, from May 23 through 26.  The top six teams from the regular season participate in the double-elimination tournament to determine the league champion.  Purdue won their first tournament championship and earned the Big Ten Conference's automatic bid to the 2012 NCAA Division I baseball tournament.  This was also Purdue's second year ever winning a conference championship in baseball, having won the conference regular season in 1909.

Format and seeding
The 2012 tournament will be a 6-team double-elimination tournament, with seeds determined by conference regular season winning percentage.  The top two seeds will receive a single bye into the semifinals (2nd Round). The 1 seed will play the lowest seeded Round 1 winner, while the 2 seed will play the highest seeded Round 1 winner.

Tournament

* - Indicates game required 11 innings.

All-Tournament Team
The following players were named to the All-Tournament Team.  Additional honorees at first base and shortstop were due to ties.

Most Outstanding Player
Kevin Plawecki was named Most Outstanding Player.  Plawecki was a junior catcher for Purdue, and also claimed the regular season Big Ten Conference Baseball Player of the Year award.

References

Tournament
Big Ten Baseball Tournament
Big Ten Conference Baseball
Big Ten baseball tournament